Lo que la gente cuenta (in English: What people say [tell]) is a Mexican horror, thriller and anthology series created and produced by Alejandro Rodríguez for TV Azteca since November 20, 2005. The series recreates popular Mexican horror legends, It first premiered on Azteca Trece and then revived and transferred to Azteca 7 in 2019.

On August 31, 2021, during the press presentation of Un día para vivir, it was announced that the series was renewed for a ninth season, which is scheduled to premiere on October 11, 2021, and its production began on August 23, 2021.

Plot 
The program focuses on horror and suspense stories based on real events, only the names of the characters were changed and also a little change of the story. 
Each episode of the series presents a story in which the main characters encounter multiple paranormal manifestations and strange beings, and have to find a way to get rid of them.

Other versions 
 Que as pessoas dizem: Brazilian version released in 2007.
 Más allá del miedo: version made from 2019 to 2021.

References

External links 
 

2005 Mexican television series debuts
2000s Mexican television series
2010s Mexican television series
2020s Mexican television series
Television series by TV Azteca
Azteca Uno original programming
Azteca 7 original programming